Diomede is the name of at least four women in Greek mythology.

Diomede may also refer to:

Places
Diomede Bay in the Sea of Japan
Diomede Islands, in the Bering Strait
Big Diomede, a Russian island, part of Chukotka Autonomous Okrug, also known as Imaqliq, Inaliq, Nunarbuk or Ratmanov Island
Little Diomede, a U.S. island, part of Alaska
Diomede, Alaska, a village in the Nome Census Area of the Unorganized Borough of the U.S. state of Alaska, located on the west coast of Little Diomede Island

People
Bernard Diomède (born 1974), French footballer
Diomede Falconio (20 September 1842 — 8 February 1917), an Italian prelate of the Roman Catholic Church.

Arts and entertainment
 Diomède (opera), a French opera by Toussaint Bertin de la Doué

Ships
HMS Diomede (D92), launched in 1919
HMS Diomede (F16), launched in 1969

See also
Diomedes (disambiguation)
Diomed, racehorse